Liu Meng (born 17 December 1995) is a Chinese field hockey player for the Chinese national team.

She participated at the 2018 Women's Hockey World Cup.

References

External links
 

1995 births
Living people
Chinese female field hockey players
Field hockey players at the 2020 Summer Olympics
Olympic field hockey players of China
21st-century Chinese women